JKCS may refer to:

John Keells IT, the current name of John Keells Computer Services
John Knox Christian School
JKCS 041